The men's 1000 metre freestyle was an event on the Swimming at the 1900 Summer Olympics schedule in Paris. It was the middle length of the three freestyle events. It was held on 11 August and 12 August 1900. 16 swimmers from 6 nations competed. The event was won by John Arthur Jarvis of Great Britain. Otto Wahle of Austria took silver, while Zoltán Halmay of Hungary earned bronze.

Background

This was the only appearance of the 1000 metre freestyle event at the Olympics. It replaced the 1200 metres from 1896, and was itself replaced in 1904 with yard versions of the 800 and 1500 metre freestyle (880 yard and 1 mile). The 800 metre stayed on the program, while the 1500 would not return until 2020.

John Arthur Jarvis was the dominant long distance swimmer of the time, and a heavy favourite in this event. He was in the midst of a run of British titles in the 880 yard (1898-1901), mile (1897-1902) and long-distance (1898-1904).

Competition format

The competition used a two-round format, with semifinals and a final. The entrants were divided into four semifinals; each semifinal had 4 swimmers. The fastest swimmer in each semifinal advanced to the final along with the next six fastest times overall. This resulted in a 10-swimmer final.

The races were swum downstream in the Seine.

Schedule

Results

Semifinals

In the first round, there were four semifinals. The winner of each semifinal advanced to the final, as did the six fastest losers from across all the semifinals. The semifinals were held on 11 August.

Semifinal 1

Semifinal 2

Semifinal 3

Semifinal 4

Final

The final was held on 12 August. Jarvis won easily, more than a minute ahead of Wahle.

Results summary

References

Swimming at the 1900 Summer Olympics